Real Live 91 is the second  live album by Scottish rock band Simple Minds, released in May 1998 by the band's own Mindmood label as a fanclub-only album given away with the first issue of Travelling Man magazine.

Recording
Real Live 91 was recorded live on 13 August 1991 at the Barrowland Ballroom, Glasgow, Scotland, UK.

Track listing

Personnel
Simple Minds
Charlie Burchill - guitar
Jim Kerr - vocals
Mel Gaynor - drums
Malcolm Foster - bass
Mark Taylor - keyboards

References

Real Live 91 at The Official Site

Albums produced by Stephen Lipson
1998 live albums
Simple Minds live albums